Phymata fasciata is a species of ambush bug in the family Reduviidae. It is found in Central America and North America.

Subspecies
These four subspecies belong to the species Phymata fasciata:
 Phymata fasciata fasciata (Gray, 1832)
 Phymata fasciata mexicana Melin, 1930
 Phymata fasciata mystica Evans, 1931
 Phymata fasciata panamensis Kormilev, 1962

References

Further reading

External links

 

Reduviidae
Articles created by Qbugbot
Insects described in 1832